Wilhelm Ulbrich (10 September 1846 – 16 October 1922) was a German journalist and regional poet of Thuringia.

Biography
Ulbrich was born in an old-established porcelain maker's family in Lichte (Wallendorf). At the age of 14 he acquired the profession of a porcelain modeler.  However, writing of poetry, songs, legends and fairy tales became a great passion with him.

Lifework
Amongst his passion to the poetic art Wilhelm Ulbrich was
 Standing correspondent of the regional journal Schwarzburgbote
 Chairmen of the south Thuringian gymnastics organisation
 1884 regional representative and honorary member of the XIII. German gymnastics region (Thuringia)
 Honorary member of numerous societies and organisations

Publication 
 1878 Volume 1, poetry, songs, legends and fairy-tales from the Thuringian forest, printed by  Ad. Riese in Saalfeld
 1902 Volume 2, popular poetry, publishing house of the princely private court printing-office

Honours 
 Medal for Distinguished Service in gold, awarded by the Prince of Reuss (younger dynasty house)
 Medal of Honour in gold, awarded by the Prince Prince Günter of Schwarzburg

Sources 
 L. Pfeifer, "Wilhelm Ulbrich, ein Volksmann des Waldes", Schwarzburgbote 29 August 1926, at Universal Media Electronic Library, University of Jena 

1846 births
1922 deaths
19th-century German poets
German journalists
German male journalists
Writers from Thuringia
Lichte
German male poets
20th-century German poets
19th-century German male writers
20th-century German male writers
People from Saalfeld-Rudolstadt